Isabelle Patissier (born March 1, 1967) is a French world champion rock climber and more recently a rally driver. She is known for winning two Lead Climbing World Cups (1990, 1991) and for being the first-ever woman in history to climb an  route

Climbing career
Patissier started climbing at age 5 or 6 with her parents. At 14 she practised mountaineering in Chamonix and also slalom and downhill skiing. In 1986 at the age of 19, she won the first French official climbing competition, taking place in the sportshall in Vaulx-en-Velin only steps from her highschool, climbing barefoot. After this she devoted herself full-time to climbing and in 1988 became both the first woman to climb an 8b (Sortilèges at Cimaï) and French champion. She subsequently won this title a further 3 times.

Personal life
Between 1993 and 1996 she was married to Nicolas Hulot a TV presenter and writer. In 1995 she retired from climbing.  In 2000, she made her motorsport debut in the Rallye Aicha des Gazelles and in 2002 competed in her first Paris-Dakar rally. She later married her copilot/mechanic Thierry Delli-Zotti.

Notable climbs

 Les sucettes à l'anis - Cimaï (FRA) - 1989
 Sortilèges - Cimaï (FRA) - 1988 -  First-ever woman in history to redpoint an 

 Échographie - Gorges du Verdon (FRA) - 1988

 Katapult - Frankenjura (GER) - 1985

Rankings

Lead Climbing World Cups

Lead Climbing World Championships

Lead Climbing European Championships

Lead Climbing Rock Master

Number of medals in Lead climbing World Cups

Rally results
2000 - 3Com Star Challenge - 2nd
2000 - Trophy des Gazelles - 3rd
2004 - 1st woman world champion (Production category), with Team Nissan Dessoude
2004 - Oman Desert Express - Winner
2004 - Rally of Tunisia - 9th
2006 - Rally of Tunisia - 7th
2007 - Rally of Tunisia - 4th
Dakar Rally - competed 2002, 2003, 2004, 2006, 2007, 2009, 2010, 2011 (3rd in 2WD, 16th in overall ranking) and 2012

See also
History of rock climbing
List of first ascents (sport climbing)

References

External links

 Official Website
 IFSC Profile

French rock climbers
French rally drivers
French female mountain climbers
1967 births
Living people
IFSC Climbing World Championships medalists
IFSC Climbing World Cup overall medalists